Heaven and Hell is the common English title of a book written by Emanuel Swedenborg in Latin, published in 1758. The full title is Heaven and its Wonders and Hell From Things Heard and Seen, or, in Latin: De Caelo et Eius Mirabilibus et de inferno, ex Auditis et Visis. It gives a detailed description of the afterlife; how people live after the death of the physical body. The book owes its popular appeal to that subject matter.

Introduction
An article about Swedenborg includes a list of biographies about him, with a brief analysis of each biographer's point of view. Some of the things he claims to have experienced are that there are Jews, Muslims and people of pre-Christian times ("pagans" such as Romans and Greeks) in Heaven. He says he spoke to married angel couples from the Golden Age who had been happy in heaven for thousands of years. The fundamental issue of life, he says, is that love of self or of the world drives one towards Hell, and love of God and of fellow beings drives one towards Heaven.

The work proved to be influential. It has been translated into a number of languages, including Danish, French, English, Hindi, Russian, Spanish, Icelandic, Swedish, Serbian and Zulu. A variety of important cultural figures, both writers and artists, were influenced by Swedenborg, including Johnny Appleseed, Jorge Luis Borges, Daniel Burnham, Arthur Conan Doyle, Ralph Waldo Emerson, John Flaxman, George Inness, Henry James, Sr., Carl Jung, Immanuel Kant, Honoré de Balzac, Helen Keller, Czesław Miłosz, August Strindberg, D. T. Suzuki, and W. B. Yeats. William Blake came from a family of Swedenborgians and annotated his copy of this text, as well as referred to and criticized Heaven and Hell and Swedenborg by name several times in his poetical/theological essay The Marriage of Heaven and Hell. Edgar Allan Poe mentions this book in his work The Fall of the House of Usher.  It also plays an important role in Honoré de Balzac's novel Louis Lambert.

Swedenborg wrote about Heaven and Hell based on what he said was revelation from God. According to Swedenborg, God is love itself and intends everyone to go to heaven. That was His purpose for creation. Thus, God is never angry, Swedenborg says, and does not cast anyone into Hell. The appearance of Him being angry at evil-doers was permitted due to the primitive level of understanding of people in Biblical times. Specifically, holy fear was needed to keep the people of those times from sinking irretrievably into the consequences of their evils. The holy fear idea was in keeping with the fundamental truth that even they could understand, that everything comes from Jehovah. In the internal, spiritual sense of the Word, however, revealed in Swedenborg’s works, God can be clearly seen for the loving Person He actually is.

Some basic teachings

God is One
Heaven and Hell opens with an  affirmation of the many statements in the Old and New Testaments (e.g., Deuteronomy 6:4, Isaiah 44:6, 45: 14, 21, Mark 12: 29,32, John 1:18, Revelation 11:17) and Swedenborg’s revelation (e.g.,) that there is a God and He is one. If God is all-powerful, He must be one. It is self-contradictory to say that there is more than one being who is all-powerful.

Angels
Swedenborg details a life after death that consists of real experiences in a world in many basic ways quite similar to the natural world. According to Swedenborg, angels in heaven do not have an ethereal or ephemeral existence but enjoy an active life of service to others. They sleep and wake, love, breathe, eat, talk, read, work, play, and worship. They live a genuine life in a real spiritual body and world.

According to Swedenborg, we in the natural world can only see angels here when our spiritual eyes are opened. This corresponds to many instances in the Old Testament  and New Testament (Matthew 18, Luke 2:14, Matthew 17, Luke 24, Revelation 1:10). Swedenborg received his revelation by the same process of his spiritual eyes being opened by God. “There is nothing concealed that shall not be uncovered, and nothing secret that shall not be known …” (Luke 12:2, 3; Matthew 10:26, Heaven and Hell, #498). Following this judgment the new spirit goes on to Heaven or Hell of his or her own free will. God does not force them. Spirits gather with those that are alike to themselves, whether in Heaven or Hell. Each Spirit is granted Angels and good Spirits, though evil spirits cannot endure their presence and so depart.

Equilibrium and spiritual free will
According to Swedenborg, people are kept in spiritual freedom by means of the equilibrium between Heaven and Hell.So who sends people to Heaven or Hell? Nobody but themselves. There is no inquiry as to their faith or former church affiliations, or whether they were baptized, or even what kind of life they lived on Earth. They migrate toward a heavenly or hellish state because they are drawn to its way of life, and for no other reason.Anyone can enter heaven. However, as soon as an evil person inhales the air there they have excruciating torment so they quickly shun it and escape to a state/place in keeping with their true state.  As the old saying goes, “Where the tree falls, there it lies.” The basic spiritual orientation of a person toward good or evil cannot be changed after death. Thus, an evil spirit could leave hell, but never wants to.

Heaven 
Swedenborg proposed that there were a multiplicity of heavens, divided into "celestial", "spiritual", and "natural" parts. In Heaven and Hell, Swedenborg allegorically likens both the nature of each heaven as well as the illumination in the sky of each heaven to the sun, moon, and stars respectively. He states that the sun of the celestial heaven and the moon of the spiritual kingdom is the Lord.

Parallel with Latter Day Saint afterlife beliefs 

Swedenborg's multiple-heavens conception of the afterlife resembles the Latter Day Saint view of the afterlife described in Doctrine and Covenants Section 76.

On February 16, 1832 Joseph Smith—the progenitor of the Latter Day Saint movement—and Sidney Rigdon—a former Baptist minister associated with Alexander Campbell's movement who converted to the Church of Christ and served as a scribe and assistant to Smith—had a joint visionary experience in Hiram, Ohio while meditating on the meaning of John 5:29. The vision they described was recorded as a revelation known to early Latter Day Saints as "the Vision" and later canonized as Doctrine and Covenants 76. Like Heaven and Hell, "the Vision" rejected a binary afterlife of eternal heaven or hell as inconsistent with God's love for humanity. Instead, "the Vision" described a heaven divided into three "degrees of glory" called the celestial, terrestrial, and telestial kingdoms and likened to the "glory of the sun," moon, and stars respectively.

The shared conception of a multi-tiered heaven may derive from the New Testament writings attributed to the apostle Paul, available to both Smith and Swedenborg through the Bible:

"There are also celestial bodies, and bodies terrestrial: but the glory of the celestial is one, and the glory of the terrestrial is another.  There is one glory of the sun, and another glory of the moon, and another glory of the stars: for one star differeth from another star in glory. So also is the resurrection of the dead."

Print versions 
 Swedenborg, E. Heaven and its wonders and Hell from things heard and seen. Swedenborg Foundation, December 1, 2001. Translator: George F. Dole, Language: English. 
 A 1958 translation:

References

Bibliography

External links 

Online version of Heaven and Hell

1758 books
Afterlife in Christianity
Angelology
God in Christianity
Heaven
Hell
Latin texts
Swedenborgianism
Works by Emanuel Swedenborg
18th-century Latin books